Sarwat Gilani (born 22 December 1982) is a Pakistani model, film, television and voice actress.

Film career  
Gilani made her movie debut in Jawani Phir Nahi Aani where she played a pregnant Pashtun woman opposite Vasay Chaudhary. She made stage directorial debut with Kiski Topi Kiskay Sar. She also starred in Jawani Phir Nahi Ani 2, where she reprised her role as Gul opposite Vasay Chaudhry.

Personal life
Gilani was born on 22 December 1982. Sarwat belongs to a Syed Gilani family through her father while her maternal grandfather Ghulam Moinuddin Khanji was Nawab of Manavadar and had a Pashtun ancestry. She married a cosmetology surgeon and actor Fahad Mirza in August 2014. Gilani gave birth to son, Rohan Mirza, in 2015. In June 2017, she became mother of another son, who was named Araiz Muhammad Mirza.

Filmography

Films

Television

Web series

References

External links 
 
 

1982 births
Living people
Actresses from Karachi
Indus Valley School of Art and Architecture alumni
Pakistani television actresses
Pakistani female models
Pakistani film actresses
21st-century Pakistani actresses
Pakistani people of Gujarati descent
Pashtun women